USS Mackerel (SST-1), originally known as  USS T-1 (SST-1), was the lead ship of the T-1-class of training submarines. She was the second submarine of the United States Navy named for the mackerel, a common food and sport fish, and was in service from 1953 to 1973. She was one of the smallest operational submarines ever built for the U.S. Navy.

Construction and commissioning
T-1 was originally planned as an experimental auxiliary submarine with hull number AGSS-570, but she was redesignated as a training submarine (SST-1) and her hull number was changed to SST-1. She was laid down on 1 April 1952, at the Electric Boat Division of General Dynamics Corporation at Groton, Connecticut.  She was launched on 17 July 1953, sponsored by Mrs. Charles R. Muir, and placed in non-commissioned service as USS T-1 on 9 October 1953.

Service history

Training, target, and equipment testing services, 1954–1966
After completing sea trials in the New London, and Massachusetts Bay areas, T-1 departed in February 1954 for Key West, Florida.  Arriving at Key West, she commenced operations with submarine and antisubmarine forces in the areas of southern Florida and Guantanamo Bay, Cuba, providing services to the Fleet Training Group working up recently constructed and recently overhauled antisubmarine warships.

On 15 July 1956, T-1 was renamed Mackerel, but retained her hull number, SST-1.

Following her renaming, Mackerel participated in fleet exercises off the United States East Coast, mainly conducting training assignments and providing services as a target, including some for the Fleet Sonar School at Key West.  She also made several cruises testing new equipment for submarines.  On 2 April 1957, she departed Key West on a special sound-damping project during a voyage to Annapolis, Maryland.  She conducted more training and target cruises into the early 1960s.

In 1963, Mackerel conducted the first of her test and evaluation voyages. Departing Key West on 8 July 1963, she sailed to the British West Indies where she tested acoustical developments in submarine hulls for a two‑week period in waters near the British West Indies.  In addition to resumption of her routine duties, she again operated in the West Indies in February 1964, again performing tasks related to evaluating submarine-hull acoustic developments.

Testing equipment for NR-1, 1966-1967

During May and June 1966, Electric Boat installed special equipment in Mackerel at Groton. Mackerel then transited south to Key West, arriving there on 26 June 1966. At Key West, she conducted experimental work during the rest of 1966 and in early 1967 to acquire data to be used in the development of future U.S. Navy submarines. She evaluated equipment intended for the NR-1 Deep Submergence Craft, including keel-mounted wheels for rolling over the ocean floor, thrusters, external television cameras, a manipulator arm, and experimental sonar. Mackerel "bottomed"—deliberately settled on the sea floor—some 225 times during the nine-month evaluation period. She completed this assignment during March 1967, after which she had some of her special equipment removed. At the same time she undertook the additional task of providing shiphandling training for submarine force junior officers. During June and July 1967, while Mackerel in drydock at Key West, additional special project equipment was removed from her.

Target services, 1967-1973
Mackerel resumed operations at Key West in 1967, running submerged to serve as a target for vessels used to train sonar operators at the Fleet Sonar School; at the same time, she undertook the additional task of providing shiphandling training for submarine force junior officers. She also acted as a target for surface and air antisubmarine warfare forces practicing off the Florida coast and in the Caribbean during the late 1960s and early 1970s. In 1971 and 1972, she provided target and training services for antisubmarine warfare units of the United States Atlantic Fleet in the Key West and the Mayport/Jacksonville, Florida, operating areas. Apparently, her non-commissioned service period ended when she was finally commissioned sometime in 1971.

Mackerel made her last dive on 21 July 1972.  After that, she remained in service with a reduced crew and conducted junior officer and midshipman training on the surface regularly through October 1972. She was taken out of service on 3 January 1973.

Decommissioning and disposal
Mackerel and her sister  were decommissioned on 31 January 1973 in a dual ceremony at Naval Station Key West. Both also were struck from the Naval Vessel Register that day.

Mackerel was sunk as a target off Puerto Rico on 18 October 1978.

Notes

Citations

References

NavSource Online: Submarine Photo Archive Mackerel (AGSS-570) T-1 (SST-1) / Mackerel (SST-1)

External links
 

 

T-1-class submarines
Cold War submarines of the United States
Ships sunk as targets
Maritime incidents in 1978
Shipwrecks of the Puerto Rico coast
Ships built in Groton, Connecticut
1953 ships